The Samsung Galaxy Tab is a line of Android OS  tablet computers produced by Samsung Electronics. The first tablet was Samsung Galaxy Tab 2010 with 7inch display, was presented to the public on 2 September 2010 at the IFA in Berlin and was available on 5 November 2010. Since then several models have been released, including models with 7.7, 8.9 and 10.1-inch displays. The Wi-Fi versions of the tablet all include a GPS system, and the 3G/4G/5G tablets add cellular capability. 
Samsung currently releases Galaxy Tab S flagship level and Galaxy Tab A mid-range, flagship class supports S pen function and uses high-end chipset Snapdragon 8 series.

Models

Samsung Galaxy Tab 

The original Samsung Galaxy Tab series was the original line of Samsung tablets. It was later split into three separate lines: the Galaxy Tab S series for high-end tablets, the Galaxy Tab A series for mid-range tablets, and the Galaxy Tab E series for entry-level tablets.

2010-2011 
 Samsung Galaxy Tab 7.0
 Samsung Galaxy Tab 7.0 Plus
 Samsung Galaxy Tab 7.7
 Samsung Galaxy Tab 8.9
 Samsung Galaxy Tab 10.1

2012 
 Samsung Galaxy Tab 2 7.0
 Samsung Galaxy Tab 2 10.1

2013 
 Samsung Galaxy Tab 3 7.0 
 Samsung Galaxy Tab 3 8.0 
 Samsung Galaxy Tab 3 10.1

2014 
 Samsung Galaxy Tab 3 Lite 7.0 
 Samsung Galaxy Tab 4 7.0 
 Samsung Galaxy Tab 4 8.0
 Samsung Galaxy Tab 4 10.1
 Samsung Galaxy Tab 4 Education

Samsung Galaxy Tab Pro 

The original Samsung Galaxy Tab Pro devices, released in 2014, were a series of three high-end tablets running the Android operating system. These tablets would be succeeded by the Galaxy Tab S series. In 2016, Samsung released another device in the Tab Pro line, the Samsung Galaxy TabPro S, although that tablet ran Windows 10 instead of Android. It was succeeded by the Samsung Galaxy Book the following year.

2014 
 Samsung Galaxy Tab Pro 8.4
 Samsung Galaxy Tab Pro 10.1
 Samsung Galaxy Tab Pro 12.2

2016 
 Samsung Galaxy TabPro S

Samsung Galaxy Tab S 

The Galaxy Tab S series is Samsung's flagship tablet line, running the Android operating system and mirroring the Galaxy S series of smartphones.

2014
 Samsung Galaxy Tab S 8.4
 Samsung Galaxy Tab S 10.5

2015
 Samsung Galaxy Tab S2 8.0
 Samsung Galaxy Tab S2 9.7

2017
 Samsung Galaxy Tab S3

2018
 Samsung Galaxy Tab S4

2019
 Samsung Galaxy Tab S5e
 Samsung Galaxy Tab S6

2020
 Samsung Galaxy Tab S6 Lite
 Samsung Galaxy Tab S6 5G
 Samsung Galaxy Tab S7
 Samsung Galaxy Tab S7+

2021
 Samsung Galaxy Tab S7 FE

2022
 Samsung Galaxy Tab S8
 Samsung Galaxy Tab S8+
 Samsung Galaxy Tab S8 Ultra

Samsung Galaxy Tab A 

The Galaxy Tab A series is a mid-range tablet line, mirroring the Galaxy A series of smartphones.

2015
 Samsung Galaxy Tab A 8.0 (2015)
 Samsung Galaxy Tab A 9.7 (2015)

2016
 Samsung Galaxy Tab A 10.1 (2016)
 Samsung Galaxy Tab A 10.1 LTE (2016)
 Samsung Galaxy Tab A 7.0 (2016)
 Samsung Galaxy Tab A 7.0 LTE (SM-T285, SM-T287)(2016)

2017
 Samsung Galaxy Tab A 8.0 (2017)

2018
 Samsung Galaxy Tab A 8.0 (2018)
 Samsung Galaxy Tab A 10.5 (2018)

2019
 Samsung Galaxy Tab A 10.1 (2019)
 Samsung Galaxy Tab A 8.0 (2019)
 Samsung Galaxy Tab A 8.0 Kids Edition (2019)

2020
 Samsung Galaxy Tab A 8.4 (2020)
 Samsung Galaxy Tab A7 (2020)

2021
 Samsung Galaxy Tab A7 Lite (2021)
 Samsung Galaxy Tab A8 (2021)

Samsung Galaxy Tab E 

The Samsung Galaxy Tab E series is a line of entry-level tablets.

2014
 Samsung Galaxy Tab E 7.0
 Samsung Galaxy Tab E 8.4
 Samsung Galaxy Tab E 10.5

2015
 Samsung Galaxy Tab E 9.6 (T560, T561)

2016 
 Samsung Galaxy Tab E 8.0 (T375, T377)

Model comparison

Galaxy Tab S

Galaxy Tab A

Galaxy Tab

Galaxy Tab (2010-2011)

Galaxy Tab 2 (2012)

Galaxy Tab 3 (2013)

Galaxy Tab 4 (2014)

Galaxy Tab Pro

See also 
 Samsung Galaxy Book
 Samsung Galaxy
 Samsung Galaxy A series
 Samsung Galaxy S series
 Samsung Galaxy Note series
 Android OS
 Tablet PC
 Barnes & Noble Nook (Samsung Galaxy Tab Nook)
Windows

References

External links
 Samsung Galaxy Tab

 
Android (operating system) devices
Galaxy Tab
Tab
Tablet computers
Products introduced in 2010